Inter-Governmental Action Group against Money Laundering in West Africa (GIABA) is a specialised institution of the Economic Community of West African States responsible for facilitating the adoption and implementation of Anti-Money Laundering (AML) and Counter-Financing of Terrorism (CFT) in West Africa. It is also the FATF Style Regional Body (FSRB) in West Africa and works with states in the region to ensure compliance with international AML/CFT standards. GIABA was established in 2000 and has its headquarters in Dakar, Senegal. GIABA consists of 17 member states.

GIABA Members

The members of GIABA as of August 2021 are:
 Republic of Benin
 Union of Comoros
 Burkina Faso
 Republic of Cape Verde
 Republic of Côte d'Ivoire
 Republic of The Gambia
 Republic of Ghana
 Republic of Guinea
 Guinea-Bissau
 Republic of Liberia
 Republic of Mali
 Republic of Niger
 Federal Republic of Nigeria
 São Tomé and Príncipe
 Republic of Senegal
 Republic of Sierra Leone
 Togolese Republic

GIABA Observers

GIABA grants Observer Status to African and non-African States, as well as Inter-Governmental Organizations that support its objectives and actions and which have applied for observer status.

The following organizations are also eligible for observer status within GIABA: the Central Banks of Signatory States, regional Securities and Exchange Commissions, UEMOA, Banque Ouest Africaine pour le Développement (BOAD), the French Zone Anti-Money Laundering Liaison Committee (Conseil Régional de l'Epargne Public et des Marchés Financiers), the African Development Bank (ADB), the United Nations Office on Drugs and Crime (UNODC), the World Bank, the International Monetary Fund (IMF), the FATF, Interpol, WCO, the Commonwealth Secretariat, and the European Union.

In 2007, Observer status was granted to the Egmont Group.

FATF-style regional bodies

GIABA is one of a number of FATF-style regional bodies (FSRB) which include:

APG (Asia/Pacific region)

CFATF (the Caribbean)

EAG (Central Asia)

ESAAMLG (Eastern and Southern Africa)

GAFISUD (South America)

MENAFATF (Middle East and North Africa)

Moneyval (Europe)

External links
 Inter-Governmental Action Group against Money Laundering in West Africa (GIABA)
 Financial Action Task Force

References

Anti-money laundering measures